Richard Umbers may refer to:

 Richard Umbers (bishop) (born 1971), auxiliary bishop of the Roman Catholic Archdiocese of Sydney
 Richard Umbers (footballer) (born 1968), Australian footballer